A Long Way from Home is an album by blues musicians Brownie McGhee and Sonny Terry released by the BluesWay label in 1969.

Reception

AllMusic reviewer Cub Koda stated: "Solid, relaxed, rockin' grooves are the hallmarks here with both artists in fine form".

Track listing
All compositions credited to Brownie McGhee except where noted
 "A Long Way from Home" (Sonny Terry) – 1:59
 "Big Question" (Brownie McGhee) – 3:41
 "Rock Island Line" (Traditional) – 2:25
 "Night and Day" (McGhee, Terry) – 4:54
 "You Just Usin' Me for a Convenience" – 3:45
 "Hole in the Wall" – 3:49
 "Life Is a Gamble" – 4:31
 "Don't Mistreat Me" (McGhee, Terry) – 3:28
 "Packin' Up, Gettin' Ready" – 5:55
 "Wailin' & Whoopin'" (Terry) – 2:57
 "B. M. Special" (McGhee, Terry, Ray Johnson, Jimmy Bond, Panama Francis) – 7:40

Personnel
Brownie McGhee – guitar, vocals
Sonny Terry – harmonica, vocals
Ray Johnson – piano
Jimmy Bond – bass
Panama Francis – drums

References

Brownie McGhee albums
Sonny Terry albums
1969 albums
BluesWay Records albums